In the Beginning There Was Rhythm is a 2002 compilation album compiled by Stuart Baker and Adrian Self and released by Soul Jazz Records. The album consists of post-punk from the United Kingdom from the late 1970s to the early 1980s made in the United Kingdom.

Release 
In the Beginning There Was Rhythm was released by Soul Jazz Records on 28 January 2002. The album was released on compact disc and vinyl record.

Reception 

From contemporary reviews, Andy Kellman of AllMusic found that the album "does a spectacular job of combining the known with the not so known" and that the album showcased "post-punk's breadth, showcasing within the grooves, jabs, and rattling waves of static the style's influences (disco, funk, reggae, Krautrock, electronic experimentation) and the styles that the style influenced (indie rock, post-rock, almost every stripe of dance music that followed) at the same time." Kellman felt that "one might bemoan the exclusion of Public Image Limited, Associates, the Normal, Magazine, or other bands crucial to the ideology, there's no denying that In the Beginning There Was Rhythm is a great gateway into this expansive, fruitful, trailblazing era." Chris Dahlen of Pitchfork praised the album stating that "Every track on this album cooks with the excitement of musicians trying new things." and "doesn't have a single limp tune" while stating "If there's anything's wrong with the disc, it's that it's too short; the story of post-punk could take up several box sets. The disc comes with 35 pages of liner notes, but the record itself doesn't tell a story or connect the songs. Many bands got left out, and it would also be interesting to hear how the bands developed-- for example, to watch the early Human League with its craptronic keyboards and all-guy line-up grow into the band that created the synth-pop masterpiece Dare." Garry Mulholland of The Guardian gave the album a four-star rating, stating "to the ranting agit-prop commitment of Gang of Four and Pop Group. In the Beginning is essential missing-link history – and body-rockin' fun". In Muzik, their reviewer "TM" gave the album a five out of five out of five rating, calling it "a choice selection [...] from the fertile post-punk period" when "bands thought nothing of combining politics and philosophy with imported dance rhythms and edgy industrial angst." concluding the album was "Fantastic. Listen and learn." Matt Galloway listed the album as a "Critic's Pick" in Now. Galloway noted that tracks like "Knife Slits Water" and "She Is Beyond Good and Evil" were "Groundbreaking stuff" but "hasn't aged particularly well" while finding "Coup", "Sluggin' Fer Jesus" and "Being Boiled" were "More natural and still fresh-sounding".

Track listing 
Track listing adapted from back of album sleeve and liner notes.

Credits 
Track listing adapted from back of album sleeve and liner notes.
 Stuart Baker – compiler, sleeve notes
 Adrian Self – compiler
 Jon Savage  – editing
 Pete Reilly  – mastering
 Duncan Cowell  – mastering
 Sir Dan Flea  – design
 B.Uttocks  – design
 Pierce Smith  – repro man
 Angela Scott  – licensing

References

Sources 
 
 
 
 
 

Post-punk compilation albums
2002 compilation albums
Soul Jazz Records compilation albums